Thomas James Leuluai (born 22 June 1985) is a New Zealand professional rugby league coach who is the assistant coach of the Wigan Warriors in the Betfred Super League and a former professional rugby league footballer who played for New Zealand at international level.

He played for the New Zealand Warriors in the NRL in two separate spells in Auckland, the London Broncos in the Super League, before moving to Wigan for the first of his two spells at the club. Leuluai was a member of the 2008 World Cup-winning New Zealand team and has also played for the Exiles.

Background
Leuluai was born in Auckland, New Zealand, and is of Samoan and Māori descent.

Leuluai's father is former Maori representative/New Zealand international James Leuluai, who scored two tries for Hull F.C. in the 1985 Challenge Cup Final 6 weeks before Thomas was born. Thomas was educated at Mount Albert Grammar School where he attended school with fellow rugby league players Sonny Bill Williams, Steve Matai and Tevita Latu. Leuluai's brother Macgraff Leuluai currently plays for Widnes Vikings, his uncle Phillip Leuluai played for Salford City Reds and his cousin Kylie Leuluai played for the Leeds Rhinos.

Playing career

New Zealand Warriors
Leuluai started his professional career at National Rugby League side New Zealand Warriors in 2003. He also played for the Junior Kiwis. At the time of his début he was the youngest player to play for the club, coincidentally in the same game Mark Robinson became the oldest player to make his début for the club. With competition from New Zealand internationals Stacey Jones and Lance Hohaia he had limited first team experience at New Zealand Warriors and consequently he spent most of the 2003 season in the Bartercard Cup playing for his youth club Otahuhu-Ellerslie, playing 10 games and scoring 5 tries. Leuluai became the second youngest player ever to represent the Kiwis when he made his début that year. 

At the end of 2004, he left the Warriors after playing 21 first grade games and scoring two tries.

London Broncos
In 2004, Leuluai signed a contract with Super League side London Broncos as a replacement for Dennis Moran who had left the Broncos to join the Wigan Warriors. He spent two years at the club playing 38 games and scoring 19 tries. Both seasons were affected by injury. In 2005, his season was cut short by a broken ankle while his 2006 campaign was disrupted by a hamstring injury sustained while playing for New Zealand. His contract was not extended and he agreed to join the Wigan Warriors for the 2007 season.

Wigan Warriors
Leuluai agreed a three-year deal with Wigan Warriors in December 2006 after months of speculation and rumours. He would replace Australians Michael Dobson and partner Trent Barrett in the halves during the 2007 season. Leuluai made his Wigan Super League début in a 16–10 defeat by the Warrington Wolves at the JJB Stadium on 9 February 2007. He scored the game-winning try against St. Helens at the JJB stadium and scored Wigan's first against the Bradford Bulls in the history breaking 31–30 comeback win in the Play-offs.

On 9 May 2008 Leuluai played for New Zealand against Australia at the Sydney Cricket Ground in the Centenary Test, which took place 100 years to the day after the New Zealand 'All Golds' first met Australia. 

At the end of 2008 Leuluai played for the New Zealand team which won the 2008 World Cup.

In April 2009, having made over seventy appearances for the club, Leuluai extended his contract with the Wigan Warriors by three years to last him until the 2012 season.

He helped Wigan to their first Championship since 1998 with a man-of-the-match performance in the 2010 Super League Grand Final earning him the Harry Sunderland Trophy in the victory over St. Helens at Old Trafford.

The 2011 Wigan Warriors season started against St Helens R.F.C. in the opening fixture of the season, with his first try coming a week later at Bradford Bulls in Round 2. As well as playing in the 2011 World Club Challenge, Leuluai scored a brace in Round 4 against Salford City Reds. A try against Hull Kingston Rovers was followed with another against Crusaders RL in Rounds 10 and 13 respectively. He then claimed two more braces in consecutive matches, firstly against Barrow Raiders in the Challenge Cup fourth round, then against Harlequins in Round 14 of 2011's Super League XVI.

Leuluai was selected for the Exiles squad for the Rugby League International Origin Match against England at Headingley on 10 
June 2011.

Leuluai played as a hooker in the 2011 Challenge Cup Final victory over the Leeds Rhinos, scoring a try at Wembley Stadium.

Return to New Zealand
In November 2011 Leuluai announced that he had signed a three-year contract with the New Zealand Warriors starting in 2013. 

In 2016 he was linked with a move back to Super League with St Helens, However, in July 2016, Leuluai announced he would be re-joining the Wigan Warriors in 2017.

Wigan comeback 
Having been awarded the number 7 jersey on his return to Wigan he made his second début against Salford Red Devils in Round 1 of the 2017 Super League season. A week later he helped Wigan to lift the World Club Challenge against the Cronulla-Sutherland Sharks scoring his first try of the season a week later against Widnes Vikings. Leuluai suffered a broken jaw in Round 11 of the Super League just six months after suffering the same injury playing for New Zealand. He made his comeback just four weeks later against St Helens, scoring his second try of the season against Wakefield Trinity.

He played in the 2017 Challenge Cup Final defeat by Hull F.C. at Wembley Stadium.
He scored his third and final try of the season against Castleford Tigers in the sixth round of the Super 8's. His good form saw his called up to the New Zealand World Cup squad playing twice for the Kiwis. After telling coach Shaun Wane he felt more comfortable in the  role he was handed the number 9 shirt after the departure of Michael McIlorum.
He played in the 2018 Super League Grand Final victory over the Warrington Wolves at Old Trafford.
He played in the 2020 Super League Grand Final which Wigan lost 8-4 against St Helens.
On 28 May, Leuluai played for Wigan in their 2022 Challenge Cup Final win over Huddersfield.

Retirement and Wigan assistant coach

On 1 September 2022, it was announced that Leuluai would be retiring at the end of the 2022 season, to replace Lee Briers as the assistant manager.
Leuluai also announced that he will lead out New Zealand in a World Cup warm up match, against Leeds Rhinos on 8 October 2022, before joining the coaching staff at New Zealand.

In 2023, Leuluai came out of retirement to play for Wigan RU with fellow assistant coach Sean O'Loughlin, scoring on his debut.

Career statistics

Honours
Wigan
 Super League: 2010, 2018
 League Leaders' Shield: 2010, 2012, 2020
 Challenge Cup: 2011, 2022
 World Club Challenge: 2017

New Zealand
 Rugby League World Cup: 2008
 Rugby League Four Nations: 2010

Individual
 Harry Sunderland Trophy: 2010

References

External links

Wigan Warriors profile
 Thomas Leuluai Wigan Career Page on the Wigan RL Fansite.
NRL stats
New Zealand Warriors profile
SL profile
2017 RLWC profile

1985 births
Living people
Exiles rugby league team captains
Exiles rugby league team players
Junior Kiwis players
Thomas
London Broncos players
New Zealand Māori rugby league players
New Zealand national rugby league team players
New Zealand sportspeople of Samoan descent
New Zealand rugby league players
New Zealand Warriors players
Otahuhu Leopards players
Rugby league five-eighths
Rugby league halfbacks
Rugby league hookers
Rugby league players from Auckland
Wigan Warriors captains
Wigan Warriors players
New Zealand expatriate sportspeople in England